Solen may refer to:

 Solen, Ancient Greek name for the Thamirabarani River
 Solen, North Dakota
 Solen (bivalve), a genus of molluscs in family Solenidae
 Solen (ship), a Swedish galleon
 Solen Désert-Mariller (born 1982), French sprinter

See also
 Sølen, mountain in Norway